Leucopogon gilbertii is a species of flowering plant in the heath family Ericaceae and is endemic to the south-west of Western Australia. It is a slender shrub with linear to lance-shaped leaves and spikes of tube-shaped white flowers on the ends of branches and in leaf axils.

Description
The flowers are small, arranged in short, dense spikes on the ends of branches or in upper leaf axils with bracts and striated bracteoles about half as long as the sepals.

Taxonomy
Leucopogon gilbertii was first formally described in 1859 by Sergei Sergeyevich Sheglejev in the Bulletin de la Société impériale des naturalistes de Moscou from specimens collected by John Gilbert. The specific epithet (gilbertii) honour the collector of the type specimens.

Distribution and habitat
This leucopogon grows in peaty sand in winter-wet places and in swamps in the Jarrah Forest and Warren bioregions of south-western Western Australia.

Conservation status
Leucopogon gilbertii is listed as "not threatened" by the Government of Western Australia Department of Biodiversity, Conservation and Attractions.

References

gilbertii
Ericales of Australia
Flora of Western Australia
Plants described in 1859